Gedelek is a small village in the Marmara Region of Turkey and Orhangazi district of Bursa Province. It is known for its pickles, especially for its hot chilli peppers.

Population in 2002 was 1380.

References

Villages in Orhangazi District